The Riverton Prize is a literature award given annually to the best Norwegian crime story (novel, short story, play, original screenplay).

The prize is named after the Norwegian journalist and author Sven Elvestad (1884-1934) who published detective stories under the pen name Stein Riverton.

Winners 

2019, Jo Nesbo
2020, Sven Petter Næss
2021, Heine Bakkeid

References

Mystery and detective fiction awards
Norwegian literary awards